Bariis Iskukaris, also called Isku-dheh karis (Somali البيلاف الصومالي), or simply referred to as Bariis is a traditional rice dish from Somali cuisine. The name Isku-dheh karis literally means "cooked mixed together", therefore it is sometimes used to more broadly refer to other grain-derived crops that require similar cooking. Hence the more specific term for this dish is bariis isku-dheh karis which means "rice (bariis) cooked mixed together".

Ingredients
Bariis iskukaris is made from basmati rice, and is typically topped with raisins, peas, and fried potatoes, onions and peppers, and  served with roasted lamb, beef, goat, camel, or chicken.  It is a national dish of Somalia and is especially popular at weddings and is a staple dish which is almost universally served as part of a Somali daily meal.  It is almost always accompanied with a roasted meat dish, the most common being lamb or goat meat, and served with fresh bananas.

Spices
The dish incorporates a spice mixture called xawaash which literally translates as "spices" in the Somali language and which is made from a mixture of ground cumin, turmeric, coriander, paprika, cardamon, black pepper, cloves, cinnamon and nutmeg.  Either saffron or orange or red food coloring are added to the dish after the rice has finished cooking to give the dish an orange color.

History and culture
Bariis iskukaris can be served with various meats including chicken, mutton, fish or camel meat. It is typically served with a banana on the side. This rice dish is often served from a clay pot called baris dhari, which serves to impart flavor from food cooked in metal pots.
Bariis and meat dishes served with it are considered Halal and as such are suitable for consumption by Muslims.

Gallery

References

Djiboutian cuisine
Rice dishes
Somali cuisine